Anisindione (brand name Miradon) is a synthetic anticoagulant and an 1,3-indandione derivative. It prevents the formation of active procoagulation factors II, VII, IX, and X, as well as the anticoagulant proteins C and S, in the liver by inhibiting the vitamin K–mediated gamma-carboxylation of precursor proteins.

References 

Anticoagulants